Unfinished Business is the ninth studio album by Canadian rock band Loverboy.  The album was released on July 15, 2014 through Loverboy Music.

Track listing 
"Fire Me Up" – 3:45
"Countin' the Nights" – 3:50
"Ain't Such a Bad Thing" – 3:39
"Come Undone" – 4:06
"Slave" – 4:41
"What Makes You So Special" – 4:03
"War Bride" – 6:19
"Doin' It the Hard Way" – 3:32
"You Play the Star" – 4:38
"Crack of the Whip" – 5:55

Personnel 
 Mike Reno – lead vocals
 Paul Dean – guitar, backing vocals, mixing
 Matt Frenette – drums
 Doug Johnson – keyboards
 Ken "Spider" Sinnaeve – bass guitar

Additional personnel
 Scott Smith – bass (posthumous)
 Aleen Hunnie – mastering

References

External links

2014 albums
Loverboy albums
Self-released albums